Aya Medany (born November 20, 1988) is an Egyptian modern pentathlete. She made her Olympic début at the 2004 Summer Olympics in Athens, Greece, as the youngest competitor both in the Egyptian team and competing in the pentathlon.

Career
Medany made her Olympic debut at the 2004 Summer Olympics at the age of 15. She was the youngest on the Egyptian team and the youngest out of any of the athletes competing in the pentathlon. She finished in 28th place overall.

She won the Olympic test event in Beijing, China, meaning that she qualified for the 2008 Summer Olympics. She went into the Olympics competing once more for Egypt after conducting pre-games training in South Korea. The pentathlon event was due to take place on the final day of the Games, and as Egypt had only won a single bronze medal up until that point, she was highlighted as a potential medal winner towards the end of the Games despite having only placed in the top three of junior competitions prior to that point. However, on the day, Medany found the horse she was randomly assigned for the riding part of the pentathlon was unwieldy, resulting her in finishing in eighth place overall. She later said of the media response, "They put everything on the riding being bad, and me needing an improvement in riding. It wasn't really my fault."

She won the World Cup event held in Százhalombatta, Budapest in 2011, ahead of the Olympic champion Lena Schoneborn and British athlete Mhairi Spence who finished in third place. She competed in the 2012 Summer Olympics in London following her qualification at the 2011 African Championships in Alexandria where she won the women's individual title.

In March 2013 she announced retirement.

Personal life
Medany began wearing a hijab after the 2008 Summer Olympics, despite the fact she says it gives her a disadvantage whilst running. She is considering retirement from the sport following the 2012 Summer Olympics due to the ban on full-body swimsuits imposed by the swimming federation FINA, which pentathlon takes its swimming rules from. Medany wants to swim in an outfit conforming to the Muslim faith, while the swimming requirements state that outfits "shall not cover the neck, extend past the shoulder, nor extend below the knee".

Her father Mahmoud Medany was a member of the Intergovernmental Panel on Climate Change which won the Nobel Peace Prize in 2007 alongside Al Gore. She works as a teacher assisting at the Arab Academy for Science and Technology and Maritime Transport. Her family refused to allow her to attend the rallies in Tahrir Square during the 2011 Egyptian revolution.

Career highlights
2002
 2nd  Youth World Championship, Budapest, Hungary

2003
 1st  Youth World Championship, Leon Gu, Mexico

2004
 1st  Youth World Championship, Albena, Bulgaria
 28th Olympic Games, Athens, Greece

2005
 2nd Junior World Championship, Moscow, Russia
 2nd  Youth World Championship, Pilsen, Czech Republic

2006
 1st World Cup #2, Milfield, United Kingdom
 1st Junior World Championship, Shanghai, China
 1st Youth World Championship, Popoli-Sulmona, Italy
 1st World Cup #5, Cairo, Egypt
 3rd USA Open Championships, Colorado, USA

2007
 1st African Championship, Cairo, Egypt
 3rd World Cup #2, Cairo, Egypt
 1st World Cup Final, Beijing, China

2008
 2nd World Cup #3, Millfield, United Kingdom
 1st World Cup #5, Kladno, Czech Republic
 2nd Senior World Championship, Budapest, Hungary
 1st Junior World Championships, Cairo, Egypt
 7th Olympic Games, Beijing, China

2009
 1st World Cup #1 Mexico City, Mexico
 2nd World Cup #2, Cairo, Egypt
 1st World Cup #4, Rome, Italy
 1st Junior World Championships (individual), Kaoshiung, Chinese Taipei
 2nd Junior World Championships (Team relay), Kaoshiung, Chinese Taipei

2010
 3rd World Cup #2, Cairo, Egypt

2011
 1st World Cup #3, Budapest, Hungary

Source:

References

External links
 
 Egyptian Federation of Modern Pentathlon
 

1988 births
Living people
Egyptian female modern pentathletes
Olympic modern pentathletes of Egypt
Modern pentathletes at the 2004 Summer Olympics
Modern pentathletes at the 2008 Summer Olympics
Modern pentathletes at the 2012 Summer Olympics
Academic staff of the Arab Academy for Science, Technology & Maritime Transport
World Modern Pentathlon Championships medalists